Malaisinia pulcherrima is a species of tephritid or fruit flies in the genus Malaisinia of the family Tephritidae.

Distribution
Myanmar.

References

Tephritinae
Insects described in 1938
Diptera of Asia